Nikkai may refer to:

 Honinbo Sansa, whose Buddhist dharma name was Nikkai.
 A Japanese electronics manufacturer, also known as NKK or Nihon Kaiheiki